Cargas is a surname. Notable people with the surname include:

 Harry J. Cargas (1932–1998), American Holocaust scholar
 James Cargas (born 1966), American attorney and politician

See also
 Vargas (surname)